Kirk McKenzie (born 9 November 2000) is a Jamaican cricketer. In August 2021, he was named in the Jamaica Tallawahs' squad for the 2021 Caribbean Premier League. He made his Twenty20 debut on 5 September 2021, for the Jamaica Tallawahs in the 2021 Caribbean Premier League. Prior to his Twenty20 debut, he was part of the West Indies' squad for the 2020 Under-19 Cricket World Cup.

He made his first-class debut on 1 June 2022, for Jamaica in the 2021–22 West Indies Championship.

References

External links
 

2000 births
Living people
Jamaican cricketers
Jamaica cricketers
Jamaica Tallawahs cricketers
Place of birth missing (living people)